French football clubs Paris Saint-Germain and Olympique de Marseille share an intense rivalry; matches between the two sides are referred to as Le Classique. The duo first met for the 18th matchday of the 1971–72 French Division 1 on December 12, 1971, with locals OM defeating PSG by a marker of 4–2 at the Stade Vélodrome. They have since consistently clashed across several national competitions such as the Ligue 1, the Coupe de France, the Coupe de la Ligue and the Trophée des Champions.

PSG and OM, however, have never been drawn together in UEFA competitions. The closest they were of facing one another in Europe was in the 2008–09 edition of the UEFA Cup, but were eliminated in the quarter-finals by Ukrainian teams Dynamo Kyiv and Shakhtar Donetsk, thus preventing a semi-final matchup between them.

Both clubs have played each other in a total of 105 official matches. Paris lead in head-to-head results with 48 wins to Marseille's 34, while the remaining 23 games ended in a draw. The fixture is more balanced in Ligue 1 with PSG claiming the three points on 35 occasions to OM's 32. By contrast, PSG have been the dominant team in cup ties. Out of 18 games, the Parisians have won 13, drawn three and lost only twice.

In spite of regularly locking horns in domestic tournaments, PSG and OM have rarely encountered in a final. They have only played four; the Parisians claimed the 2006 and 2016 French Cup titles as well as the French Super Cup in 2020, while the Olympians clinched the French Super Cup in 2010. In the rivalry's history, only one game has been cancelled. Scheduled to be held in March 2020, it was never played because of the COVID-19 pandemic in France.

Overall record

By competition

By venue

Ligue 1 record

The Ligue 1, commonly referred outside France to as the French League or simply L1 in French media, is the top division in French football. Organised by the Ligue de Football Professionnel (LFP) since 1932, it was initially called National before being renamed Division 1 a year later. In 2002, the league was completely rebranded and became known as Ligue 1.

L1 summary

L1 matches

Coupe de France record

The Coupe de France, commonly referred outside France to as the French Cup or simply CdF in French media, is a tournament organised by the French Football Federation (FFF) since 1917. Unlike the now-defunct Coupe de la Ligue, it is open to all amateur and professional clubs in France, including clubs based in the overseas departments and territories.

CdF summary

CdF matches

Coupe de la Ligue record

The Coupe de la Ligue, commonly referred outside France to as the French League Cup or simply CdL in French media, was a tournament organised by the Ligue de Football Professionnel (LFP). Unlike the Coupe de France, it was only open to professional clubs in France. First held in 1994, the LFP abolished the competition in 2020 to reduce season schedule.

CdL summary

CdL matches

Trophée des Champions record

The Trophée des Champions, commonly referred outside France to as the French Super Cup or simply TdC in French media, is a tournament organised by the Ligue de Football Professionnel (LFP) since 1995. Held annually, the trophy is contested between the champions of Ligue 1 and the winners of the Coupe de France in a single match.

TdC summary

TdC matches

Notes

References

External links
Official websites
PSG.FR - Site officiel du Paris Saint-Germain
Site officiel de l'OM - OM

French football derbies